The 1945–46 New York Rangers season was the franchise's 20th season. During the regular season, the Rangers compiled a 13–28–9 record and finished with 35 points. With a last-place finish, the Rangers did not qualify for the NHL playoffs.

Regular season

Final standings

Record vs. opponents

Schedule and results

|- align="center" bgcolor="#FFBBBB"
| 1 || 31 || @ Chicago Black Hawks || 5–1 || 0–1–0
|-

|- align="center" bgcolor="#CCFFCC"
| 2 || 3 || @ Toronto Maple Leafs || 4–1 || 1–1–0
|- align="center" bgcolor="#FFBBBB"
| 3 || 4 || @ Detroit Red Wings || 4–1 || 1–2–0
|- align="center" bgcolor="#FFBBBB"
| 4 || 8 || Chicago Black Hawks || 5–4 || 1–3–0
|- align="center" bgcolor="#CCFFCC"
| 5 || 10 || Detroit Red Wings || 2–0 || 2–3–0
|- align="center" bgcolor="#FFBBBB"
| 6 || 11 || Boston Bruins || 7–1 || 2–4–0
|- align="center" bgcolor="#FFBBBB"
| 7 || 15 || @ Montreal Canadiens || 2–0 || 2–5–0
|- align="center" bgcolor="#FFBBBB"
| 8 || 17 || Montreal Canadiens || 7–3 || 2–6–0
|- align="center" bgcolor="#FFBBBB"
| 9 || 18 || Toronto Maple Leafs || 3–1 || 2–7–0
|- align="center" bgcolor="white"
| 10 || 22 || @ Chicago Black Hawks || 3–3 || 2–7–1
|- align="center" bgcolor="#FFBBBB"
| 11 || 24 || @ Toronto Maple Leafs || 4–3 || 2–8–1
|- align="center" bgcolor="#CCFFCC"
| 12 || 25 || @ Detroit Red Wings || 4–1 || 3–8–1
|- align="center" bgcolor="#FFBBBB"
| 13 || 28 || @ Boston Bruins || 5–1 || 3–9–1
|-

|- align="center" bgcolor="#FFBBBB"
| 14 || 1 || @ Montreal Canadiens || 4–3 || 3–10–1
|- align="center" bgcolor="#CCFFCC"
| 15 || 9 || Toronto Maple Leafs || 2–1 || 4–10–1
|- align="center" bgcolor="#FFBBBB"
| 16 || 13 || Chicago Black Hawks || 7–4 || 4–11–1
|- align="center" bgcolor="#FFBBBB"
| 17 || 16 || Montreal Canadiens || 4–2 || 4–12–1
|- align="center" bgcolor="#FFBBBB"
| 18 || 19 || @ Boston Bruins || 8–7 || 4–13–1
|- align="center" bgcolor="white"
| 19 || 22 || @ Toronto Maple Leafs || 5–5 || 4–13–2
|- align="center" bgcolor="#FFBBBB"
| 20 || 23 || Toronto Maple Leafs || 4–3 || 4–14–2
|- align="center" bgcolor="#FFBBBB"
| 21 || 26 || Detroit Red Wings || 3–2 || 4–15–2
|- align="center" bgcolor="#CCFFCC"
| 22 || 30 || Chicago Black Hawks || 3–2 || 5–15–2
|- align="center" bgcolor="white"
| 23 || 31 || Montreal Canadiens || 0–0 || 5–15–3
|-

|- align="center" bgcolor="white"
| 24 || 3 || @ Detroit Red Wings || 3–3 || 5–15–4
|- align="center" bgcolor="#CCFFCC"
| 25 || 6 || Boston Bruins || 4–2 || 6–15–4
|- align="center" bgcolor="#FFBBBB"
| 26 || 12 || @ Montreal Canadiens || 9–3 || 6–16–4
|- align="center" bgcolor="#CCFFCC"
| 27 || 13 || Chicago Black Hawks || 3–2 || 7–16–4
|- align="center" bgcolor="#FFBBBB"
| 28 || 16 || @ Boston Bruins || 3–2 || 7–17–4
|- align="center" bgcolor="#FFBBBB"
| 29 || 17 || Boston Bruins || 4–2 || 7–18–4
|- align="center" bgcolor="#FFBBBB"
| 30 || 19 || @ Toronto Maple Leafs || 3–1 || 7–19–4
|- align="center" bgcolor="#FFBBBB"
| 31 || 20 || @ Chicago Black Hawks || 9–1 || 7–20–4
|- align="center" bgcolor="#FFBBBB"
| 32 || 26 || @ Montreal Canadiens || 5–3 || 7–21–4
|- align="center" bgcolor="#CCFFCC"
| 33 || 27 || Detroit Red Wings || 5–2 || 8–21–4
|-

|- align="center" bgcolor="white"
| 34 || 3 || Toronto Maple Leafs || 6–6 || 8–21–5
|- align="center" bgcolor="#FFBBBB"
| 35 || 6 || @ Chicago Black Hawks || 6–2 || 8–22–5
|- align="center" bgcolor="#FFBBBB"
| 36 || 7 || @ Detroit Red Wings || 4–2 || 8–23–5
|- align="center" bgcolor="white"
| 37 || 10 || Chicago Black Hawks || 2–2 || 8–23–6
|- align="center" bgcolor="white"
| 38 || 14 || Boston Bruins || 2–2 || 8–23–7
|- align="center" bgcolor="#CCFFCC"
| 39 || 16 || @ Boston Bruins || 6–2 || 9–23–7
|- align="center" bgcolor="#FFBBBB"
| 40 || 17 || Montreal Canadiens || 5–4 || 9–24–7
|- align="center" bgcolor="white"
| 41 || 21 || Detroit Red Wings || 2–2 || 9–24–8
|- align="center" bgcolor="white"
| 42 || 24 || @ Chicago Black Hawks || 2–2 || 9–24–9
|- align="center" bgcolor="#CCFFCC"
| 43 || 27 || @ Toronto Maple Leafs || 6–4 || 10–24–9
|- align="center" bgcolor="#FFBBBB"
| 44 || 28 || @ Detroit Red Wings || 4–1 || 10–25–9
|-

|- align="center" bgcolor="#FFBBBB"
| 45 || 3 || Toronto Maple Leafs || 5–2 || 10–26–9
|- align="center" bgcolor="#FFBBBB"
| 46 || 6 || @ Montreal Canadiens || 7–3 || 10–27–9
|- align="center" bgcolor="#CCFFCC"
| 47 || 10 || Detroit Red Wings || 3–2 || 11–27–9
|- align="center" bgcolor="#FFBBBB"
| 48 || 12 || Boston Bruins || 3–2 || 11–28–9
|- align="center" bgcolor="#CCFFCC"
| 49 || 13 || @ Boston Bruins || 5–3 || 12–28–9
|- align="center" bgcolor="#CCFFCC"
| 50 || 17 || Montreal Canadiens || 8–5 || 13–28–9
|-

Playoffs
The Rangers finished the season in last place in the NHL for the fourth consecutive season and missed the 1946 Stanley Cup playoffs.

Player statistics
Skaters

Goaltenders

†Denotes player spent time with another team before joining Rangers. Stats reflect time with Rangers only.
‡Traded mid-season. Stats reflect time with Rangers only.

See also
1945–46 NHL season

References

New York Rangers seasons
New York Rangers
New York Rangers
New York Rangers
New York Rangers
Madison Square Garden
1940s in Manhattan